Qinar-e Sofla (also Romanized as Qīnar-e Soflá; also known as Qīz-e Pā'īn) is a village in Sokmanabad Rural District, Safayyeh District, Khoy County, West Azerbaijan Province, Iran. At the 2006 census, its population was 360, in 57 families.

References 

Populated places in Khoy County